Bryn Mawr station is a SEPTA Regional Rail station in Bryn Mawr, Pennsylvania. It is located in the western suburbs of Philadelphia at Morris and Bryn Mawr Avenues. It is served by most Paoli/Thorndale Line trains with the exception of a few "limited" and express trains.

The ticket office at this station is open weekdays 6:05 a.m. to 6:05 p.m. excluding holidays. There are 254 parking spaces at the station. This station is in fare zone 3 and is 10.1 track miles from Suburban Station. In 2017, the average total weekday boardings at this station was 937 and the average total weekday alightings was 930.

History
The original station was designed by Joseph M. Wilson and built in 1869 by the Pennsylvania Railroad. It was demolished in 1963, and replaced by a mid-20th Century mock-colonial style structure. The former freight house on the south side of the tracks, which dates back to 1870, is currently a local restaurant.

The interlocking tower was placed in service on August 11, 1895 but suffered a fire in 1994 and its duties were transferred to Paoli Tower.

The original substation constructed by the Pennsylvania Railroad in 1913–1915 at the station was part of a project to electrify the line between Broad Street Station in Philadelphia and Paoli Station and was the first catenary electrification project done by the Pennsylvania Railroad. The substation has since been relegated to switching duties. It was proposed in 2013 that this substation be replaced as part of a larger project, but that was rejected by local government.

A train crash occurred at the station on May 18, 1951 injuring 63 and killing 8. There is also an interlocking tower and an interlocking at this station.

Station layout
Bryn Mawr has two low-level side platforms with pathways connecting the platforms to the inner tracks. It also contains a tunnel below the tracks connecting the two platforms.

Image gallery

References

External links
Bryn Mawr Station | SEPTA

SEPTA Regional Rail stations
Philadelphia to Harrisburg Main Line
Lower Merion Township, Pennsylvania
Railway stations in Montgomery County, Pennsylvania
Railway stations in the United States opened in 1869
1869 establishments in Pennsylvania
Former Amtrak stations in Pennsylvania
Railway stations in Pennsylvania at university and college campuses